Spialia therapne, the Corsican red-underwing skipper, is a butterfly in the family Hesperiidae. It is found on the Mediterranean islands of Corsica and Sardinia.

The wingspan is 19–21 mm. Adults are on wing from April to September in multiple generations per year.

The larvae feed on Sanguisorba minor. They make a shelter of spun leaves.

References

Spialia
Butterflies described in 1832